Walter Bolden (December 17, 1925 – February 7, 2002) was an American jazz drummer. 

On joining Horace Silver’s trio, Bolden worked with Stan Getz in 1950, touring and recording in 1951.

He later recorded with Gerry Mulligan (1951), before joining Howard McGhee’s band. 

In 1954, he played with Teddy Charles and recorded with Henri Renaud (1954) and toured and recorded with Lambert, Hendricks, and Ross.

He was also a member of the quintet led by Zoot Sims and Al Cohn.

References

1925 births
2002 deaths
American jazz drummers
American male drummers
20th-century American drummers
20th-century American male musicians
American male jazz musicians